Baldev Raj (9 April 1947 – 6 January 2018) was an Indian scientist and director of the Indira Gandhi Centre for Atomic Research (IGCAR) in Kalpakkam, India.

Education
He had a Bachelors in Engineering (B.E.) from Government Engineering College, Raipur Pt. Ravishankar Shukla University, Raipur (Now National Institute of Technology, Raipur), and a PhD from IISc, Bangalore, D.Sc. (h.c.) from Sathyabama Deemed University, Chennai.

Career
He was director of the Indira Gandhi Centre for Atomic Research (IGCAR) in Kalpakkam, India. He was also the director of the National Institute of Advanced Studies.

He died on 6 January 2018 in Pune from an apparent cardiac arrest.

Awards
He was awarded one of the H K Firodia awards, padma shri award also for 2015.

References

External links
Home Page

1947 births
2018 deaths
Engineers from Jammu and Kashmir
Recipients of the Padma Shri in science & engineering
Indian Institute of Science alumni
Indian metallurgists
Sathyabama Institute of Science and Technology alumni
20th-century Indian engineers
National Institute of Technology, Raipur alumni